Bakare Kone (born April 15, 1989) is an Ivorian footballer currently playing as an attacking midfielder.

References

External links

1989 births
Living people
Ivorian footballers
People from Bouaké
Botola players
Dibba FC players
Al-Ittihad Kalba SC players
Wydad AC players
Ajman Club players
Emirates Club players
Al Hamriyah Club players
Al-Arabi SC (UAE) players
UAE Pro League players
UAE First Division League players
Expatriate footballers in the United Arab Emirates
Association football midfielders